Heremaia "Harry" Ngata (born 24 August 1971) is a former New Zealand association football player who played as a midfielder.

Club career
Ngata began his career with Hull City in England, and may have been the first Maori footballer to play in the English league.
Ngata won 1998 New Zealand Players' Player of the Year award, whilst playing with North Shore United, where he won the club's Player of the Year award twice.
One of the most successful parts of his career was the five years that he spent playing for the Kingz in the Australian NSL. where he became very popular.

International career
Ngata scored New Zealand's goal in his full All Whites debut, a 1–3 loss against Saudi Arabia on 28 April 1993. He was included in the New Zealand side for the 1999 Confederations Cup finals tournament and he ended his international playing career with 28 A-international caps and 3 goals to his credit, his final cap a substitute appearance in a 7–0 win over Vanuatu on 13 June 2001.

Post-retirement
Ngata works occasionally as a football commentator for SKY TV in New Zealand.
He has worked in the role of Sports Ambassador for the SPARC organisation (Sport & Recreation New Zealand).

References

External links 
 Harry Ngata Interview

1971 births
Living people
Sportspeople from Whanganui
New Zealand association footballers
New Zealand international footballers
League of Ireland players
Bohemian F.C. players
Hull City A.F.C. players
North Shore United AFC players
National Soccer League (Australia) players
Football Kingz F.C. players
New Zealand Māori sportspeople
Te Aitanga-a-Hauiti people
English Football League players
1998 OFC Nations Cup players
1999 FIFA Confederations Cup players
2000 OFC Nations Cup players
Association football midfielders
Expatriate footballers in England
Expatriate association footballers in the Republic of Ireland
New Zealand expatriate sportspeople in England
New Zealand expatriate sportspeople in Ireland